Jehu is a masculine given name. The best known of that name is Jehu, a king of Israel in the Bible. There is also another biblical Jehu (prophet). Others bearing the name include:

 Jehu V. Chase (1869–1937), United States Navy rear admiral and Commander-in-Chief of the United States Fleet
 Jehu Chesson (born 1993), American National Football League player
 Jehu Chiapas (born 1984), Mexican footballer
 Jehu Davis (1738–1802), American planter and politician
 Jehu Elliott (1813–1876), Justice of the Indiana Supreme Court
 Jehu Eyre (1738–1781), American businessman and veteran of the French and Indian War and American Revolutionary War
 Jehu Grant (c. 1752–1840), runaway slave who served in the Continental Army during the American Revolutionary War
 Jehu Grubb (c. 1781–1854), American politician
 Yehu Orland (born 1981), Israeli basketball player and coach

See also
 Jahu (disambiguation)
 Jehuu Caulcrick (born 1983), American football coach and former player
 Jehue Gordon (born 1991), Trinidadian hurdler

Masculine given names